Bruno Valdez may refer to:

 Bruno Valdez (footballer, born 1992), Paraguayan defender
 Bruno Valdez (footballer, born 2002), Argentine centre-back